Seigler Canyon Creek (also known as Siegler Creek and Sigler Creek) is creek in Lake County, California.

Course

It flows east-northeast until it reaches Cache Creek 1 mile north of Lower Lake. 

Fish

Endemic species include the hitch (Lavinia exilicauda), which were regularly caught in Seigler Canyon Creek by the local Elem Indian Colony.

See also
 Rivers of Lake County, California

References

Sources

Rivers of Lake County, California
Lower Lake, California